Massey Island is an uninhabited island in the Bathurst Island group, Qikiqtaaluk Region, Nunavut, Canada. It is located in the Arctic Ocean, south of Île Vanier (across Pearse Strait) and north of Alexander Island and Île Marc (across Boyer Strait).

The island is named for former Governor General of Canada Vincent Massey.

References 

 Sea islands: Atlas of Canada; Natural Resources Canada

External links
 Massey Island in the Atlas of Canada - Toporama; Natural Resources Canada

Islands of the Queen Elizabeth Islands
Uninhabited islands of Qikiqtaaluk Region